The 1914 Saint Louis Billikens football team was an American football team that represented Saint Louis University during the 1914 college football season. In their third and final season under head coach Frank Dennie, the Billikens compiled a 5–4 record and outscored opponents by a total of 227 to 115. The team played its home games at Sportsman's Park at St. Louis.

Schedule

References

Saint Louis
Saint Louis Billikens football seasons
Saint Louis Billikens football